Schoten is a municipality located in Antwerp Province, Belgium. The municipality only comprises the town of Schoten proper. As of 1 January 2020 Schoten has a total population of 34,311. Schoten borders the Antwerp districts Merksem to the west and Deurne to the south west. Neighboring municipalities include Brasschaat to the north, Brecht to the north east, Schilde to the east, and Wijnegem to the south.

History

Early Middle Ages
The history and usage of the name Schoten may have come from the name given to the wooden dividing walls (schot in Dutch) that were driven in the ground to separate private property.  The Christianization of the area dates from the end of the 7th century, under the influence of Abbot Ursmarus, of Lobbes Abbey, which owned property here.

In the 12th century, the territory was under the political authority of the lords of Breda, then of the lords of Bergen-op-Zoom.  Religiously, it was administered by the Villers Abbey.

16th century until today
Already by the beginning of the 16th century, well-off burghers and merchants from neighboring Antwerp built castles in Schoten as secondary residences. The local community succeeded, however, in maintaining its rural Campine character until well into the 19th century. Industry first developed on the border with Merksem, later along the Albert Canal. Much of the rest of the town's territory was kept green and was again used by neighboring Antwerp residents for building extensive villas such as Koningshof and Schotenhof.

Main sights

The water-encircled Schoten castle started as a farm in the 13th century, and is now converted into a local cultural centre.
The main square is lined with a Gothic Revival city hall and adorned with a Till Eulenspiegel fountain.
The Villers castle also dates from the 13th century, while the Gothic-style church of St-Cordula dates from the 15th century.
Schoten also has a number of nature reservations and wooded areas, such as the Peerdsbos, the Vordensteyn domain, 't Asbroek, Wijtschot or the municipal park.
Schotenhof is an area of Schoten located in the north-east of the municipality. It was created in the beginning of the 20th century, a time when in several wood-rich municipalities around Antwerp the local castles were divided into lots to allow for the building of residential houses and vacation cottages.

Events and Sports
The World Festival of Folklore Schoten, a folk dance festivity founded in 1959, takes place annually in the summer.
The Scheldeprijs, an annual cycling race taking place in April, starts in Antwerp and finishes in Schoten.
The local football club is the KFC Schoten SK.

Politics

Municipal council
The municipal council, per the outcome of the 2018 local elections, is a coalition of NV-A (16 seats) and Open-VLD (1 seat), a total of 17 out of 31 seats.

Council of Mayor and Aldermen
Since 2018, the Council of Mayor and Aldermen, the municipal executive board, consists of:

Infrastructure
170 metres tall lattice tower at 51°17'33"N 4°32'24"E, which is an important site for FM- and TV-broadcasting for the Antwerp area.

Economy
Schoten was the place where the Belgian fast-food restaurant Quick established its first outlet in 1971.

Notable citizens
Bob Mendes, writer of thrillers and detective stories (b. 1928)
Michel A. J. Georges, biologist and professor at the University of Liège (b. 1959)
Marie-Rose Morel, politician (b. 1972 d. 2011)
Véronique De Kock, Miss Belgium 1995 (b. 1977)
Geert Steurs, professional road bicycle racer (b. 1981)
Thor Salden, also known as Thor!, singer (b. 1997)
 Harrie Hendrickx, former mayor

International relations

Twin towns – sister cities
Schoten is twinned with:

 Tarnów, Poland
 Voorschoten, Netherlands

See also 
 Deuzeld, a neighborhood of Schoten that is part of the Antwerp agglomeration.

References

External links

Official website, in Dutch
Official festival website

Municipalities of Antwerp Province
Populated places in Antwerp Province